Ipomopsis multiflora, known as manyflowered gilia or manyflowered ipomopsis, is a short-lived perennial flowering plant. Among the Zuni people, the powdered whole plant is applied to face to cure headache, and it is also applied to wounds. The crushed blossoms are smoked in corn husks to "relieve strangulation".

References

multiflora
Flora of the Southwestern United States
Plants used in traditional Native American medicine
Plants described in 1859